Scaphinotus punctatus is a species of ground beetles in the family Carabidae. It is found in Central America and North America.

References

 Erwin, Terry L. (2007). A Treatise on the Western Hemisphere Caraboidea (Coleoptera): Their classification, distributions, and ways of life. Volume I. Trachypachidae, Carabidae - Nebriiformes 1, 323 + 22 plates.

Further reading

 Arnett, R.H. Jr., and M. C. Thomas. (eds.). (2000). American Beetles, Volume I: Archostemata, Myxophaga, Adephaga, Polyphaga: Staphyliniformia. CRC Press LLC, Boca Raton, FL.
 Arnett, Ross H. (2000). American Insects: A Handbook of the Insects of America North of Mexico. CRC Press.
 Richard E. White. (1983). Peterson Field Guides: Beetles. Houghton Mifflin Company.

Carabinae
Beetles described in 1859